Abergorlech is a village  to the north-west of Llandeilo in the Welsh principal area of Carmarthenshire. It lies on the River Cothi on the B4310 road, between Brechfa to the southwest and Llansawel to the northeast.

The Pont Cothi bridge, which crosses the River Cothi in the centre of the village, is a grade II* listed building.

The village is connected to Dafydd Gorlech (fl. c. 1410–1490), one of the poets of the nobility.

References

Villages in Carmarthenshire